Sho Shimabukuro (born 30 July 1997) is a Japanese tennis player.

Shimabukuro has a career high ATP singles ranking of world No. 259 achieved on 9 January 2023. He also has a career high ATP doubles ranking of world No. 438 achieved on 26 September 2022.

Shimabukuro represents Japan at the Davis Cup, where he has a W/L record of 1–0.

Challenger and World Tennis Tour Finals

Singles: 6 (4-2)

Doubles: 7 (3–4)

References

External links

1997 births
Living people
Japanese male tennis players
People from Gifu
Universiade medalists in tennis
Tennis players at the 2018 Asian Games
Universiade silver medalists for Japan
Asian Games competitors for Japan
Medalists at the 2019 Summer Universiade
Asian Games medalists in tennis
21st-century Japanese people